Indian Broom (foaled 1933 in Virginia) was an American Thoroughbred racehorse who on April 11, 1936 set a track and World record for a mile and one-eighth on dirt at California's Tanforan Racetrack and who returned the next year on December 4, 1937 and broke that same track's record again in a six furlong sprint.

Background
Bred by the Brookmeade Stud of Isabel Dodge Sloane, Indian Broom was sold in February 1936 to Canadian businessman Austin C. Taylor for what turned out to be a bargain-basement price of $4,000. The colt's race conditioning was then placed with trainer Darrell Cannon.

Racing career
In his only start in the U.S. Triple Crown series, Indian Broom ran third to winner Bold Venture in the 1936 Kentucky Derby.

Indian Broom's 1936 World record was set in Tanforan's Marchbank Handicap. In an interview several days later, jockey Basil James said that Indian Broom could have gone even faster as he had "never made a move" with the colt. Indian Broom won the Marchbank Handicap again in 1938. However, that year his most important win came in the San Juan Capistrano Handicap at Santa Anita Park.

Pedigree

References

1933 racehorse births
Thoroughbred racehorses
Racehorses bred in Virginia
Racehorses trained in the United States
Horse racing track record setters
American racehorses